Folsomdale is an unincorporated community in Graves County, Kentucky, United States.

A post office was opened in the community in 1886, and named for President Cleveland's bride Frances Folsom, who had recently become First Lady at age 21.

References

Unincorporated communities in Graves County, Kentucky
Unincorporated communities in Kentucky